This list of cemeteries in Alabama includes currently operating, historical (closed for new interments), and defunct (graves abandoned or removed) cemeteries, columbaria, and mausolea which are historical and/or notable. It does not include pet cemeteries.

Autauga County 
 Daniel Pratt Cemetery, Prattville; NRHP-listed

Barbour County 
 Shorter Cemetery, Eufaula

Bibb County 
 Blocton Italian Catholic Cemetery, West Blocton

Calhoun County 
 Hillside Cemetery, Anniston; NRHP-listed

Clarke County 

 Airmount Grave Shelter, near Thomasville; NRHP-listed
 Mount Nebo Cemetery, near Carlton

Dallas County 
 Old Live Oak Cemetery, Selma

Jefferson County 
 Elmwood Cemetery, Birmingham
 Oak Hill Cemetery, Birmingham; NRHP-listed

Lauderdale County 
 Forks of Cypress Cemetery, near Florence; NRHP-listed

Limestone County 
 Glenwood Cemetery, Huntsville
 Maple Hill Cemetery, Huntsville; NRHP-listed

Macon County 

 Tuskegee University Campus Cemetery, Tuskegee University, Tuskegee

Madison County 
 Mount Paran Cemetery, New Market; NHRP-listed
 Redstone Arsenal cemeteries, Redstone Arsenal

Mobile County 
 Ahavas Chesed Cemetery, Mobile
 Catholic Cemetery, Mobile
 Church Street Graveyard, Mobile
 Magnolia Cemetery, Mobile; NRHP-listed
 Mobile National Cemetery, Mobile; NRHP-listed
 Sha'arai Shomayim Cemetery, Mobile

Montgomery County 
 Antioch Baptist Church, Mount Meigs
 Greenwood Cemetery, Montgomery

Russell County 
 Fort Mitchell National Cemetery, Fort Mitchell

Shelby County 
 Alabama National Cemetery, Montevallo

See also
 List of cemeteries in the United States
 Pioneer cemetery

References

Alabama